Thymelaea  (the sparrow-worts) is a genus of about 30 species of evergreen shrubs and herbs in the flowering plant family Thymelaeaceae, native to the Canary Islands, the Mediterranean region, north to central Europe, and east to central Asia.

Etymology
The genus name Thymelaea is a combination of the Greek name for the herb thyme θύμος (thúmos) and that for the olive ἐλαία (elaía) - in reference to its thyme-like foliage and olive-like fruit; while the English name Sparrow-wort (used by Thomas Green in his 18th century Universal Herbal) is a translation of the name of the genus Passerina (in which Thymelaea was formerly placed), derived from the word passer "sparrow" - given the plants in reference to a perceived similarity of the shape of the fruit to a sparrow's beak.

Species

References

Flora Europaea: Thymelaea
Flora of Pakistan: Thymelaea

Thymelaeoideae
Malvales genera
Taxa named by Philip Miller